Please add names of notable painters with a Wikipedia page, in precise English alphabetical order, using U.S. spelling conventions. Country and regional names refer to where painters worked for long periods, not to personal allegiances.

Alexandre Cabanel (1823–1889), French painter
Vincenzo Cabianca (1827–1902), Italian painter
W. Lindsay Cable (1900–1949), Scottish artist and illustrator
Francis Cadell (1883–1937), Scottish painter
James Cadenhead (1858–1927), Scottish painter
Paul Cadmus (1904–1999), American tempera artist
Pogus Caesar (born 1953), St Kitts/English photographer, artist and television producer
Cagnaccio di San Pietro (1897–1946), Italian painter
Gustave Caillebotte (1848–1894), French painter and patron
Lawrence Calcagno (1913–1993), American painter
Alexander Calder (1898–1976), American sculptor
Alexander Milne Calder (1846–1923), Scottish/American sculptor
Alexander Stirling Calder (1870–1945), American sculptor
John Cale (born 1942), Welsh 
Mary Callery (1903–1977), American sculptor
Jacques Callot (1592–1635), Lorraine print-maker and draftsman
Abraham van Calraet (1642–1722), Dutch painter and engraver
Luis Enrique Camejo (born 1971), Cuban painter
David Young Cameron (1865–1945), Scottish painter and etcher
Mary Cameron (1865–1921), Scottish painter
Gianfredo Camesi (born 1940), Swiss painter
Steven Campbell (1953–2007), Scottish painter
Thomas Campbell (1790–1858), Scottish/English sculptor
Jacob van Campen (1596–1657), Dutch artist and architect
Robert Campin (1375–1444), Flemish/Netherlandish painter
Govert Dircksz Camphuysen (1623–1672), Dutch painter
Canaletto (1697–1768), Italian painter of views
Noe Canjura (1922–1970), Salvadoran/French painter
Antonio Canova (1757–1822), Italian sculptor
Cao Buxing (曹不興, 3rd c. AD), Chinese painter
Cao Zhibai (曹知白, 1271–1355), Chinese painter and bibliophile
Josef Čapek (1887–1945), Austro-Hungarian/Czechoslovak painter, writer and poet 
Jan van de Cappelle (1626–1679), Dutch painter
Tom Carapic (born 1939), Yugoslav/Serbian found object artist
Caravaggio (1573–1610), Italian painter
Arthur B. Carles (1882–1952), American painter
Nancy Carline (1909–2004), English painter and sculptor
Richard Carline (1896–1980), English artist, writer and arts administrator
Sydney Carline (1888–1929), English landscape painter and war artist
Carlo Carlone (1686–1775), Italian/German painter and engraver
Emil Carlsen (1853–1932), Danish/American painter
John Fabian Carlson (1875–1945), American painter
Rhea Carmi (born 1942), Israeli/American painter and mixed-media artist
Nicolas Carone (1917–2010), American artist
Emile Auguste Carolus-Duran (1838–1917), French painter and art instructor
Vittore Carpaccio (c. 1460 – 1525), Italian painter
Jane Carpanini (born 1949), English artist and teacher
Emily Carr (1871–1945), Canadian artist and writer
Henry Carr (1894–1970), English painter and war artist
Thomas Carr (1909–1999), English painter 
Carlo Carrà (1881–1966), Italian painter and futurist
Annibale Carracci (1557–1602), Italian painter and instructor
Agostino Carracci (1560–1609), Italian painter, print-maker and art teacher
Ludovico Carracci (1555–1619), Italian etcher, painter and print-maker
Eugène Carrière (1849–1906), French painter
Dora Carrington (1893–1932), English painter and decorative artist
Joanna Carrington (1931–2003), English artist
Leonora Carrington (1917–2011), English/Mexican painter and novelist
Alexander Carse (c. 1770 – 1843), Scottish painter
Clarence Holbrook Carter (1904–2000), American artist
Ramon Casas i Carbó (1866–1932), Spanish/Catalan artist and graphic designer
Felice Casorati (1883–1963), Italian painter, sculptor and print-maker
Judy Cassab (1920–2015), Australian painter
Mary Cassatt (1844–1926), American painter and print-maker
A. J. Casson (1898–1992), Canadian artist
Humberto Castro (born 1957), Cuban painter
Carlos Catasse (1944–2010), Chilean painter
George Catlin (1796–1872), American painter, writer and traveler
Patrick Caulfield (1936–2005), English painter and print-maker
Louis de Caullery (c. 1555 – c. 1621), Flemish painter
Giovanni Paolo Cavagna (1556–1627), Italian painter
Bernardo Cavallino (1622–1654), Italian painter and draftsman
Giorgio Cavallon (1904–1989), Italian/American painter
Antonio Cavallucci (1752–1795), Italian painter
Mirabello Cavalori (c. 1520 – 1572), Italian painter
Roger Cecil (1942–2015), Welsh painter and mixed media artist
Vija Celmins (born 1938), Latvian/American visual artist and draftsman
Maximilian Cercha (1818–1907), Polish painter and draftsman
Avgust Černigoj (1898–1985), Slovenian painter
Bartolomeo Cesi (1556–1629), Italian painter
Paul Cézanne (1839–1906), French painter
Paul Émile Chabas (1869–1937) French painter and illustrator
Marc Chagall (1887–1985), Russian/French painter, draftsman and illustrator
George Paul Chalmers (1833–1878), Scottish painter
Alfred Edward Chalon (1780–1860), Swiss/English painter
Brenda Chamberlain (1912–1971), Welsh artist, poet and novelist
Chang Dai-chien (張大千, 1899–1983), Chinese painter
Charles Joshua Chaplin (1825–1891), French painter, print-maker and etcher
Minerva J. Chapman (1858–1947), American painter
Jean-Baptiste-Siméon Chardin (1699–1779), French painter
Caroline Chariot-Dayez (born 1958), Belgian painter and philosopher
Michael Ray Charles (born 1967), American painter
Sam Charles (1887–1949), American artist, pianist and professor
Elizabeth Charleston (1910–1987), American painter
Nicolas Toussaint Charlet (1792–1845), French painter and print-maker
Evan Charlton (1904–1984), English/Welsh painter
Felicity Charlton (1913–2009), English/Welsh painter 
Chafik Charobim (1894–1975), Egyptian painter
Louisa Chase (1951–2016), American painter and print-maker
William Merritt Chase (1849–1916), American painter
Théodore Chassériau (1819–1856), Dominican/French painter
Russell Chatham (1939–2019), American landscape artist and author
Pierre Puvis de Chavannes (1824–1898), French painter of murals
Jules Chéret (1836–1932), French painter and lithographer
Evelyn Cheston (1875–1929), English painter
Chen Chi (程及, 1912–2005), Chinese/American painter
Patrick Ching (born 1962), American wildlife artist and conservationist
Derek Chittock (1922–1986), English painter, cartoonist and art critic 
Chinwe Chukwuogo-Roy (1952–2012), Nigerian/English visual artist
Chen Chun (陳淳, 1483–1544), Chinese artist
Chen Hong (陳閎, fl. within 7th–10th cc.) Chinese imperial court painter
Chen Hongshou (陳洪綬, 1598–1652), Chinese painter
Chen Jiru (陳繼儒, 1558–1639), Chinese painter, calligrapher and essayist
Chen Lin (陳琳, c. 1260–1320), Chinese landscape painter
Chen Lu (陳錄, fl. 14th or 15th c.), Chinese painter
Chen Rong (陳容, c. 1200–1266), Chinese painter and politician
Chen Yifei (陳逸飛, 1946–2005), Chinese painter, art director and film director
Cheng Jiasui (程嘉燧, 1565–1643), Chinese landscape painter and poet
Cheng Shifa (程十髮, 1921–2007), Chinese calligrapher, painter and cartoonist
Cheng Zhengkui (程正揆, 1604–1670), Chinese landscape painter and poet
Billy Childish (born 1959), English painter, writer and musician
Giorgio de Chirico (1888–1978), Italian artist and writer
Antonín Chittussi (1847–1891), Austro-Hungarian/Czech painter
Adam Chmielowski (1888–1878), Polish painter and founder of charitable religious orders
Daniel Chodowiecki (1726–1801), German painter and print-maker
Choi Buk (최북, fl. 1755–1785), Korean painter
Dan Christensen (1942–2007), American painter
Henry B. Christian (1883–1953), American painter
Ernest William Christmas (1863–1918), Australian painter
Christo (1935–2020), Bulgarian/American conceptual artist
Petrus Christus (1410–1476), Netherlandish painter
Abdur Rahman Chughtai (1899–1975), Indian/Pakistani painter
Frederick Edwin Church (1826–1900), American landscape painter
Betty Churcher (1931–2015), Australian painter and arts administrator
Peter Churcher (born 1964), Australian artist
Winston Churchill (1874–1965), English painter, writer and prime minister
Leon Chwistek (1884–1937) Austro-Hungarian/Polish painter, critic and philosopher
Cimabue (1240–1302), Italian painter and designer of mosaics
Giovanni Battista Cipriani (1727–1785), Italian painter and engraver
Antonio Ciseri (1821–1891), Swiss/Italian religious painter
Joze Ciuha (1924–2015), Yugoslav/Slovenian painter
Mikalojus Konstantinas Čiurlionis (1875–1924), Lithuanian painter, composer and writer
Franz Cižek (1865–1946), Austrian painter and art education reformer
George Claessen (1909–1999), Sri Lankan artist
Pieter Claesz (1597–1660), Dutch still-life painter
Alson S. Clark (1876–1949), American painter, photographer and art educator
Edward Clark (1926–2019), American painter and shaped canvas innovator
Jean Clark (1902–1999), English mural painter
Walter Leighton Clark (1859–1935), American artist, businessman and inventor
Joaquín Clausell (1866–1935), Mexican painter, lawyer and politician
John Clayton (1728–1800), English painter
Francesco Clemente (born 1952), Italian/American painter, draftsman and sculptor
Grace Clements (1905–1969), American painter, mosaicist and art critic
Chuck Close (1940–2021), American photo-realist painter and photographer
François Clouet (1510–1572), French miniaturist and painter
Giorgio Giulio Clovio (1498–1578), Croatian/Italian miniaturist and painter
Henry Ives Cobb, Jr. (1883–1974), American artist and architect
Juan Fernando Cobo (born 1959), Colombian painter, illustrator and sculptor
Pieter Codde (1599–1678), Dutch painter
Charles Codman (1800–1842), American painter
Isabel Codrington (1874–1943), English watercolor artist 
Jon Coffelt (born 1963), American painter, sculptor and sewer
Nevin Çokay (1930–2012), Turkish painter and art history teacher
Dorothy Coke (1897–1979), English war artist and watercolor painter
Ruth Collet (1909–2001), English painter, illustrator and print-maker
William Coldstream (1908–1987), English realist painter and art teacher
Elsie Vera Cole (1885–1967), English painter, engraver and art teacher
Thomas Cole (1801–1948), American landscape and history painter
Robert Colescott (1925–2009), American painter and satirist
Evert Collier (1640–1708), Dutch painter
John Collier (1850–1934), English artist and writer
Raphaël Collin (1850–1916), French painter and teacher
Elisabeth Collins (1904–2000), English painter and sculptor 
Jacob Collins (born 1964), American realist painter
Samuel Colman (1832–1920), American painter, interior designer and writer
Jean Colombe (1430–1493), French miniature painter and illuminator
Giovanni Battista Innocenzo Colombo (1717–1793), Swiss painter and stage-set designer
Robert Colquhoun (1914–1962), Scottish painter, print-maker and set designer
Jaime Colson (1901–1975), Dominican modernist painter
Robert Combas (born 1957), French painter and sculptor
Mario Comensoli (1922–1993), Swiss painter
Charles Conder (1868–1909), Australian painter and lithographer
William Congdon (1912–1998), American/European painter
Charles Fremont Conner (1857–1905), American painter
Kevin Connor (born 1932), Australian painter
William Conor (1881–1968), Irish/English artist
John Constable (1776–1837), English landscape painter
Constant (1920–2005), Dutch painter, sculptor and musician
Theo Constanté (1934–2014), Ecuadorian abstract painter
John Kingsley Cook (1911–1994), English artist and wood engraver
May Louise Greville Cooksey (1878–1943), English painter
Cassius Marcellus Coolidge (1844–1934), American painter
A.D.M. Cooper (1856–1924), American painter
Colin Campbell Cooper (1856–1937), American painter
Emma Lampert Cooper (1855–1920), American painter
Adriaen Coorte (1665–1707), Dutch still-life painter
Constance Copeman (1864–1953), English painter, print-maker and engraver
John Singleton Copley (1737–1815), American painter
Teresa Copnall (1882–1972), English painter
Fern Coppedge (1883–1951), American impressionist painter
Coppo di Marcovaldo (1225–1276), Italian painter
Edward Corbett (1919–1971), American abstract painter
Lovis Corinth (1858–1925), German painter, print-maker and writer
Mary Corkling (1850–1937), English painter
Corneille (1922–2010), Dutch artist
Thomas Cornell (1937–2012), American painter and draftsman
Paul Cornoyer (1864–1923), American painter
Jean-Baptiste-Camille Corot (1796–1875), French painter and print-maker
Correggio (1489–1534), Italian painter
Pietro da Cortona (1596–1669), Italian painter and architect
Piero di Cosimo (1462–1521), Italian painter
Francesco del Cossa (c. 1435 – c. 1477), Italian painter
Pierre Auguste Cot (1837–1883), French classicist painter
Colijn de Coter (1440–1532), Netherlandish altarpiece painter
Jean-Yves Couliou (1916–1995), French painter
Noel Counihan (1913–1986), Australian painter, print-maker and illustrator
Glenys Cour (born 1924), Welsh artist
Gustave Courbet (1819–1877), French realist painter
Marie Courtois (c. 1605 – 1703), French miniature painter
Thomas Couture (1815–1879), French history painter and teacher
John Covert (1882–1960), American painter
Raymond Teague Cowern (1913–1986), English painter and illustrator
James Cowie (1886–1956), Scottish portrait painter
Jan Cox (1919–1980), Dutch/Belgian painter
Raymond Coxon (1896–1997), English painter and war artist
Francesco Cozza (1605–1682), Italian painter
Dirk Crabeth (1501–1574), Dutch glass painter, tapestry designer and cartographer
Wouter Pietersz Crabeth (1510–1590), Dutch glass painter
Frank Barrington Craig (1902–1951), English painter and art teacher
James Humbert Craig (1877–1944), Irish painter
Lucas Cranach the Elder (1472–1553), German painter, print-maker and engraver
Lucas Cranach the Younger (1515–1586), German painter
Lefevre James Cranstone (1822–1893), English/Australian painter
Hugh Adam Crawford (1898–1982), Scottish portrait painter
Fred Cress (1938–2009), English/Australian painter
Susan Crile (born 1942), American painter and print-maker
Carlo Crivelli (1435–1495), Italian painter
Ivan Lacković Croata (1932–2004), Yugoslav/Croatian painter
Charles Crodel (1894–1974), German painter and stained-glass artist
Ray Crooke (1922–2015), Australian landscape artist
Jasper Francis Cropsey (1823–1900), American landscape artist
William Crosbie (1915–1999), Scottish painter
Henri-Edmond Cross (1856–1910), French painter and print-maker
Jean Crotti (1878–1958), French painter
Gonzalo Endara Crow (1936–1996), Ecuadorian painter and writer
William Crozier (1893–1930), Scottish painter
Robert Crozier (1815–1891), English portrait artist
István Csók (1865–1961), Hungarian painter 
Enzo Cucchi (born 1949), Italian painter
Cui Bai (崔白, fl. 1050–1080), Chinese painter
Cui Zizhong (崔子忠, died 1644), Chinese painter
Constance Gordon-Cumming (1837–1924), Scottish painter and travel writer
Charles Cundall (1890–1971), English topographical painter
Nora Cundell (1889–1948), English painter
Rinaldo Cuneo (1877–1939), American painter
John Steuart Curry (1897–1946), American painter and illustrator
Frances Currey (1925–2012), American painter 
Aelbert Cuyp (1620–1691), Dutch landscape painter
Benjamin Gerritsz Cuyp (1612–1652), Dutch landscape painter
Jacob Gerritsz. Cuyp (1594–1652), Dutch portrait and landscape painter
Boleslaw Cybis (1895–1957), Polish painter, sculptor and muralist
Władysław Czachórski (1850–1911), Polish painter
Józef Czapski (1896–1993), Polish artist, author and army officer
Szymon Czechowicz (1689–1775), Polish painter
Alfons von Czibulka (1888–1969), Austro-Hungarian/Czech painter and writer
Béla Czóbel (1883–1976), Hungarian painter 
Tibor Czorba (1906–1985), Hungarian painter 
Tytus Czyżewski (1880–1945), Polish painter, art theorist and poet

References
References can be found under each entry.

C